Alain Kan (born 14 September 1947), is a French singer who disappeared on 14 April 1990.

Early life 
Born Alain Michel Zisa in Paris, France, on 14 September 1947. Kan was raised by his mother and stepfather, and grew up with his stepsister Véronique, seven years older than him. "Kan" is the surname of his stepfather, Kan never knew his biological father.

Music career 
In the spring of 1963, at the age of 18, Kan released his first 45 rpm at Pathé-Marconi, "Si l'amore" (written by Bob du Pac and Jean-Louis Chauby) on the A-side, and "Quand tu reviendras" (written by Michel Jourdan and Danyel Gérard) on the B-side. The following year, in 1964, he released three 4-track EPs from Decca, mostly consisting of covers of American and Canadian singers, including Paul Anka.

Glam rock period 
In the 1970s, Kan travelled to London, England, where he developed an interest in the music of Lou Reed, T. Rex, and David Bowie, who would go on to be an enormous influence on him, and he met Marie France. Inspired by the glam rock music of these musicians, Kan made a foray into glam rock with the album "Et Gary Cooper s'éloigna dans le désert..." (1975), followed by "Heureusement en France on ne se drogue pas" (1976). While recording the latter at the Château d'Hérouville, in Hérouville-en-Vexin, Val-d'Oise, he met David Bowie. Kan said of this meeting: "In Hérouville, I met Bowie, who took me away for ten days in his black Mercedes. Since then I have not missed my discoloration ... There have been lots of photos in the press and since then there has been a kind of respect for me".

Disappearance 
Alain Kan disappeared on 14 April 1990. He was last seen at the Rue de la Pompe Parisian metro station.

Personal life 
In 1971, Alain Kan became the brother-in-law of singer Christophe, when Christophe married Kan's sister, Véronique.

See also
List of people who disappeared

Discography 
Et Gary Cooper S'Éloigna Dans Le Désert... (1975)
Heureusement En France, On Ne Se Drogue Pas... (1976)
What Ever Happened To Alain Z. Kan (1979)
Parfums De Nuit... (1986)

Compilations
Alain Kan13 Coffret 3 CD – 2007

EP
Tu le sais14 EP – 1964
Pour mon anniversaire15 EP – 1964
Paris sous la pluie16 EP – 1964

Singles
Si l'amour17 Single – 1963
Tu peux pas savoir18 Single – 1964
Tu ne m'aimes pas19 Single – 1964
Pour mon Anniversaire20 Single – 1964
Amédée21 Single sous le nom d'Amédée.jr – 1970
Mon homme à moi... c'est toi Single sous le nom Les Pingouins22 – 1970
Pauv’ pomme23 Single – 1971
Je n'ai plus envie sans toi24 Single – 1972
Au pays de Pierrot25 Single – 1973
55–60 (dès que vient le samedi soir) 26 Single – 1973
Star ou rien27 Single – 1973
City palace28 Single – 1974
Sally29 Single avec Gazoline – 1977
Killer man30 Single avec Gazoline – 1977
BB for Brigitte31 Single – 1986

References

1990s missing person cases
1944 births
20th-century French male singers
French male singer-songwriters
French rock singers
Glam rock musicians
Missing people
Missing person cases in France
Musicians from Paris